Isertia is a genus of flowering plants in the family Rubiaceae. It contains 15 species of shrubs or small trees that are indigenous to the neotropics. A few are cultivated as ornamentals.

Systematics
Isertia was named by Johann von Schreber in 1789. The generic name honors the German botanist and explorer Paul Erdmann Isert.

Isertia is divided into two sections: section Cassupa and section Isertia. In section Cassupa, the fruit is a berry and the ovary usually has two or three locules. In section Isertia, the fruit is a pyrene and the ovary usually has five or six locules.

Molecular phylogenetic studies have shown that Isertia is most closely related to Kerianthera, a monospecific genus from Amazonian Brazil.

Species

Isertia coccinea 
Isertia haenkeana 
Isertia hypoleuca 
Isertia krausei 
Isertia laevis 
Isertia longifolia 
Isertia parviflora 
Isertia pittieri 
Isertia psammophila 
Isertia reticulata 
Isertia rosea 
Isertia scorpioides 
Isertia spiciformis 
Isertia verrucosa 
Isertia wilhelminensis

References

Rubiaceae genera
Taxa named by Aimé Bonpland